This Is England is a 2006 British drama film written and directed by Shane Meadows. The story centres on young skinheads in England in 1983. The film illustrates how their subculture, which has its roots in 1960s West Indies culture, especially ska, soul, and reggae music, became influenced by the far-right, especially white nationalists and white supremacists, which led to divisions within the skinhead scene. The film's title is a direct reference to a scene where the character Combo explains his nationalist views using the phrase "this is England" during his speech.

Plot
In July 1983, Shaun is a troubled 12-year-old boy who lives with his widowed mother and is frequently antagonised in school and around town. On the last day of the school year, Shaun gets into a fight at school with a boy named Harvey after the latter makes an offensive joke about his father, who was killed in the Falklands War. On his way home, Shaun comes across a gang of young skinheads led by Woody, who feels sympathy for Shaun and invites him to join the group. He introduces Shaun to Milky, the only black skinhead of the gang; Pukey, Kes, and the overweight, dim-witted Gadget. Despite some initial hostilities between Shaun and Gadget, the gang accepts Shaun as a member. Shaun bonds closely with Richard "Woody" Woodford, viewing him a big brother figure, and his girlfriend Lorraine "Lol" Jenkins, who takes a motherly role towards him. Shaun also develops a romantic relationship with Michelle, also known as Smell, an older girl who dresses in a new wave, new romantic style.

During a party one night, the group is ambushed by a bald, tattooed, moustachioed machete-wielding man, who is then attacked by Andrew "Combo" Gascoigne, a first-wave skinhead. With the attack revealed to be a prank, Woody announces that Combo had just finished a three-year prison sentence, and Combo introduces the man as his associate Banjo. Combo, a charismatic but unstable man with sociopathic tendencies, begins to express English nationalist and racist views, alienating Woody, Lol, Kes, and Milky. Later on, he attempts to enforce his leadership over the other skinheads. When Combo mentions the Falklands War as part of a speech, an upset Shaun reveals to the gang that his father died in that conflict, which Combo then uses to manipulate the boy into joining his side. Consequently, the gang splits, with young Shaun, the belligerent Pukey, and Gadget, who feels bullied by Woody for his weight, choosing Combo over Woody's apolitical gang.

Shaun finds a hero-figure in Combo, who in turn is impressed by, and identifies with, Shaun. Combo's group attend a National Front meeting. On the drive home Pukey expresses doubt over their racist and nationalistic politics. Combo furiously stops the car and yanks Pukey out, lightly assaulting him in ridicule in front of the others, abandoning him in isolated countryside by the roadside.

The gang deface walls, intimidate local children and spray racist slogans on Asian shopkeeper Mr Sandhu's walls, whilst Shaun, previously banned from the shop, launches a bigoted verbal assault on Sandhu with demands for alcohol and cigarettes. Combo viciously threatens Sandhu with a machete and the gang steal goods for a birthday party under Combo's instructions.

Combo becomes upset after Lol, Woody's girlfriend, rejects him when he admits that he has loved her since they had sex years before. To console himself, Combo buys cannabis from Milky, and invites him to a party. While intoxicated, Combo and Milky bond, but Combo becomes increasingly bitter and envious, all wrapped up in a racist viewpoint, when Milky shares details of his many relatives, comfortable family life and happy upbringing, everything that Combo lacked.  An enraged Combo enters a frenzied state and brutally beats Milky unconscious, while Banjo holds down Shaun, and Meggy watches on in horror. An angry Combo violently throws Shaun out of his flat after Shaun verbally defends Milky, then slams the door hard. When Banjo attempts to hit Milky as well, Combo violently beats him and evicts him and Meggy from the flat. Horrified at the realisation of what he has done, a remorseful Combo weeps over Milky. Shaun and Combo later take Milky to a nearby hospital.

The film cuts forward to Shaun, who is in his bedroom looking at a picture of his late father. He is contemplating the incident and brooding about what happened, with his mother Cynthia assuring him that Milky will be all right. Shaun is then shown walking near the beach and throwing his St George's Flag, a gift from Combo, into the sea.

Cast

 Thomas Turgoose as Shaun Fields
 Stephen Graham as Andrew "Combo" Gascoigne
 Jo Hartley as Cynthia Fields
 Joe Gilgun as Richard James "Woody" Woodford
 Vicky McClure as Frances Lorraine "Lol" Jenkins
 Andrew Shim as Michael "Milky"
 Rosamund Hanson as Michelle "Smell"
 Andrew Ellis as Gary "Gadget" Flowers
 Perry Benson as Ronald "Meggy" Megford
 George Newton as Banjo
 Jack O'Connell as "Pukey" Nicholls
 Kieran Hardcastle as Kes
 Chanel Cresswell as Kelly Jenkins
 Danielle Watson as Trev 
 Sophie Ellerby as Pob
 Kriss Dosanjh as Mr. Sandhu
 Michael Socha as Harvey
 Frank Harper as Lenny
 Hannah Walters as Trudy

Soundtrack

 "54–46 Was My Number" – Toots & The Maytals
 "Come On Eileen" – Dexys Midnight Runners
 "Tainted Love" – Soft Cell
 "Underpass/Flares" (Film dialogue)
 "Nicole (Instrumental)" – Gravenhurst
 "Cynth / Dad" (Film dialogue)
 "Morning Sun" – Al Barry & The Cimarons
 "Shoe Shop" (Film dialogue)
 "Louie Louie" – Toots & The Maytals
 "Pressure Drop" – Toots & The Maytals
 "Hair in Cafe" (Film dialogue)
 "Do the Dog" – The Specials
 "Ritornare" – Ludovico Einaudi
 "This Is England" (Film dialogue)
 "Return of Django" – Lee "Scratch" Perry & The Upsetters
 "Warhead" – UK Subs
 "Fuori Dal Mondo" – Ludovico Einaudi
 "Since Yesterday" – Strawberry Switchblade
 "Tits" (Film dialogue)
 "The Dark End of the Street" – Percy Sledge
 "Oltremare" – Ludovico Einaudi
 "Please Please Please Let Me Get What I Want" (The Smiths cover) – Clayhill
 "Dietro Casa" – Ludovico Einaudi
 "Never Seen the Sea" – Gavin Clark (of Clayhill)

Additional music from the film includes
 "Pomp and Circumstance March No 1 in D. OP 39/1" (Edward Elgar) – performed by Royal Philharmonic Orchestra
 "Maggie Gave a Thistle" – Wayne Shrapnel and The Oi Stars
 "Let's Dance" – Jimmy Cliff

Production
Much of the film was shot in residential areas of Nottingham, including St Ann's, Lenton, and The Meadows, with one section featuring abandoned houses at RAF Newton, a former airbase close to Bingham, Nottinghamshire. The opening fight was filmed at Wilsthorpe Business and Enterprise College, a secondary school in Long Eaton, Derbyshire, close to the Nottinghamshire/Derbyshire boundary. Additional scenes such as 'the docks' were filmed in Turgoose's home town of Grimsby. Turgoose was 13 at the time of filming. He had never acted before, was banned from his school play for bad behaviour, and demanded £5 to turn up for the film's auditions. The film was dedicated to Turgoose's mother, Sharon, who died of cancer on 29 December 2005; while she never saw the film, she saw a short preview. The cast attended her funeral.

Setting
The film is set in an unidentified town in the Midlands. Although much of the film was shot on location in Nottingham, a number of scenes portray the town's docks, which precludes this inland city being the setting for the action. Similarly, the dialects of the main characters are drawn from a wide geographical area.

Reception
On the review aggregator website Rotten Tomatoes, the film has an approval rating of 93% based on 94 reviews, with an average rating of 7.70/10. The website's critical consensus reads, "A moving coming-of-age tale that captures the despair among England's working-class youth in the 1980s". Metacritic gives the film a weighted average score of 86 out of 100 based on 23 reviews, indicating "universal acclaim". This made it the tenth best reviewed film of the year.

The film appeared on several US critics' top ten lists of 2007; it was third on the list by Newsweek's David Ansen, seventh on the list by The Oregonian's Marc Mohan, and ninth on the list by Los Angeles Times Kevin Crust.

In Britain, director Gillies Mackinnon rated the film the best of the year and David M. Thompson, critic and film-maker, rated it third. The film was ranked fourteenth in The Guardians list of 2007's Best Films and fifteenth in Empire's Movies of the Year.

Accolades
The film won the Alexander Korda Award for Best British Film at the 2007 British Academy Film Awards.

At the 2006 British Independent Film Awards, the film won the award for Best Film and Thomas Turgoose won the award for Most Promising Newcomer.

TV miniseries

In 2010, a spin-off series set three years after the film, This Is England '86, was shown on Channel 4. A sequel to the series set two and a half years later, This Is England '88, was broadcast in December 2011. A third installment, This Is England '90, was shown in September 2015.

References

External links
 
 
 
 
 EyeForFilm.co.uk – Interview with Stephen Graham about This Is England

 
2006 films
2006 drama films
2006 independent films
2000s coming-of-age drama films
2000s gang films
Best British Film BAFTA Award winners
Best Foreign Film Guldbagge Award winners
British coming-of-age drama films
British independent films
English nationalism
Film4 Productions films
Films about racism
Films about race and ethnicity
Films adapted into television shows
Films directed by Shane Meadows
Films scored by Ludovico Einaudi
Films set in 1983
Films shot in Derbyshire
Films shot in Lincolnshire
Films shot in Nottinghamshire
Skinhead films
Teen crime films
Social history of England
2000s English-language films
2000s British films